Per Gawelin (born 24 January 1978) is a retired Swedish football midfielder.

References

1978 births
Living people
Swedish footballers
Örebro SK players
Association football midfielders
Allsvenskan players
Sweden youth international footballers
Sweden under-21 international footballers
Sweden international footballers